Eupithecia vallenarensis is a moth in the family Geometridae. It is found in the regions of Atacama (Huasco Province), Coquimbo (Limari Province), Santiago (Santiago Province), Maule (Linares Province) and Biobio (Biobio Province) in Chile. The habitat consists of the Intermediate Desert, Coquimban Desert, Central Valley and Northern Valdivian Forest biotic provinces.

The length of the forewings is about 8.5-9.1 mm for females. The forewings are greyish brown, with
dull reddish brown scaling in the median area, along the cubital vein and at the vein endings. The hindwings are pale greyish white, with a variable number of grey and greyish brown scales and with an area of black scaling on the anal margins opposite the black abdominal segment. Adults have been recorded on wing in October, November, December and January.

Etymology
The specific name is based on the type locality.

References

Moths described in 1987
vallenarensis
Moths of South America
Endemic fauna of Chile